A special election was held in  on January 11, 1813 to fill a vacancy left by the death of Thomas Blount (DR) on February 7, 1812.

Election results

Kennedy took his seat on January 30, 1813.

See also
List of special elections to the United States House of Representatives

References

North Carolina 1813 03
North Carolina 1813 03
1813 03
North Carolina 03
United States House of Representatives 03
United States House of Representatives 1813 03
January 1813 events